Otara can refer to:

Ōtara, a suburb of South Auckland, New Zealand
Otara Gunewardene, a Sri Lankan entrepreneur
Otara River, in the north of New Zealand's North Island
Otara Millionaires Club, a New Zealand music group
Ōtara-Papatoetoe, a local government area in Auckland
Otara Hill, one of the volcanoes in the Auckland volcanic field
Ōtara-Papatoetoe Local Board, one of the 21 local boards of the Auckland Council
Otara-Mangere, a locality within the Counties Manukau District Health Board
How Bizarre: The Story of an Otara Millionaire, a documentary film
Otara College, a school in Otara, Auckland, New Zealand
Otara Bridge, part of the Ohingaiti railway station
Otara (New Zealand electorate), a New Zealand parliamentary electorate in Auckland, from 1984 to 1996
Otara Intermediate School, an intermediate school in Papatoetoe, a suburb of Manukau Ward, Auckland Region, New Zealand